Brooklyn is a settlement and rural valley in the Tasman District of New Zealand's upper South Island. It is located on the outskirts of Motueka, and is dominated by orchards.

The Brooklyn Recreation Reserve, a flat, 4.6 ha grassed reserve, was donated to Tasman District Council in 1984. It includes remnants of lowland forest the council has deemed "significant", including a hillside of tawhai rauriki or black beech and regenerating native forest dominated by  kānuka. The reserve has had limited weeds and no outbreak of wild pigs.

Brooklyn is connected to Woodstock by a cycling trail. In 2018, Tourism Minister Kelvin Davis announced funding to upgrade the trail.

The Blue Gum corner of Motueka River, just outside the village, is a river swimming spot.

History

The valley road was partially closed due to flooding in July 2013.

Homes and buildings in the valley were severely damaged by floodwaters during Cyclone Gita in February 2018. Several people had to flee or be rescued from their flooded homes, and the road was left only accessible by 4WD vehicles.

In 2020, the National Institute of Water and Atmospheric Research monitored air quality in Brooklyn on behalf of Tasman District Council. It found quality regularly exceeded World Health Organization guidelines due to home fireplaces.

Education

The school received an additional $76,230 property funding in December 2019.

References

Populated places in the Tasman District